Maxie Anderson (September 10, 1934 – June 27, 1983) was an American hot air balloonist and Congressional Gold Medal recipient    He was part of the balloon crews that made the first Atlantic ocean crossing by balloon in the Double Eagle II and the first Pacific ocean crossing by balloon in the Double Eagle V.

Early life and education
Born Max Leroy Anderson in Sayre, Oklahoma, to rancher and mining industry executive Carl Anderson. He entered the Missouri Military Academy at Mexico, Missouri, at the age of eight, and throughout his high school years assisted his father in building pipelines. He engaged in prospecting in the Arctic Circle before completing his degree in industrial engineering at the University of North Dakota in 1956. He developed an early interest in flight, obtaining a license at the age of fifteen (having misrepresented his age). This allowed him to fly a plane to the academy at age 15, while cars were banned except for those aged 18. In Albuquerque, New Mexico, he entered the mining industry, acquiring his own company, Ranchers Exploration and Development Corporation, before he was thirty. His career was marked by innovations in extraction technologies, delivery systems, and administrative practices. For his work, Anderson was inducted into the National Mining Hall of Fame.

Ballooning

Along with his friend Ben Abruzzo, he became interested in hot air ballooning. The two decided to commemorate the fiftieth anniversary of Charles Lindbergh's flight, and engaged balloonist Ed Yost (whose transatlantic bid had failed in 1976) to build the Double Eagle. The balloon was launched near Marshfield, Massachusetts on September 9, 1977, but the flight was aborted off the coast of Iceland on September 13. In 1978 Larry Newman, a manufacturer of hang gliders, was added to the crew for the next attempt in the Double Eagle II. This venture was launched August 11 at Presque Isle, Maine, and arrived at Miserey, France, on August 17. For their efforts, the team was awarded the Congressional Gold Medal in 1979. It was both a distance record (3108 miles) and a duration record (137 hours) for the sport.

With his son Kristian, he made the first non-stop trans-North American balloon flight. The Kitty Hawk departed Fort Baker, California, on May 8, 1980, and landed on May 12 at Sainte-Félicité, Quebec.

Anderson attempted to complete a circumnavigation of the globe by balloon. With Don Ida he launched the balloon Jules Verne from Luxor, Egypt on January 11, 1981, travelling , and landing in Hansa, India 48 hours later.

Death
Anderson was killed on June 27, 1983, near Bad Kissingen, West Germany. He was in the air with co-pilot Don Ida. Having no wish to stray across the border into East Germany or Czechoslovakia, he attempted to release the gondola from the envelope at touchdown. The bolts failed to fire, and a gust re-lofted the vehicle, whereupon the explosive bolts deployed, and both Anderson and Ida were killed in the fall. The locale of the accident is also given as "near the village of Schönderling in the county of Bad Kissingen" in a history of the Gordon Bennett Cup balloon race, in which they were participating as non-competitors at the time.

Legacy
In 1973, Anderson founded the Anderson Valley Vineyards with his wife Patty. "We have a lot of balloon-themed wines and items," wine expert Angela Le Quieu says. She adds that the label for the winery's Balloon Blush wine always uses a picture from the previous year's Albuquerque International Balloon Fiesta.
Creating a foundation, the Abruzzo and Anderson families partnered with the City of Albuquerque and constructed the Anderson-Abruzzo Albuquerque International Balloon Museum next to the launch field of the Albuquerque International Balloon Fiesta.  The World's most photographed event, Fiesta is held the second week of every October.    In addition to the Anderson-Abruzzo Albuquerque International Balloon Museum, Anderson's name lives on with the Maxie Anderson Award, for Albuquerque's "business owner who has demonstrated excellence in business success; reputation; community involvement; leadership; humanity; and humor."

See also 
 List of Congressional Gold Medal recipients

References

External links

 

1934 births
1983 deaths
20th-century American businesspeople
American balloonists
Aviators from Oklahoma
Aviators killed in aviation accidents or incidents in Germany
Burials in New Mexico
Businesspeople from Oklahoma
Congressional Gold Medal recipients
People educated at Missouri Military Academy
People from Sayre, Oklahoma
University of North Dakota alumni
Balloon flight record holders
American aviation record holders
Victims of aviation accidents or incidents in 1983
Transatlantic flight